In the IEEE 802.11 wireless LAN protocols (such as Wi-Fi), a MAC frame is constructed of common fields (which are present in all types of frames) and specific fields (present in certain cases, depending on the type and subtype specified in the first octet of the frame).

The very first two octets transmitted by a station are the Frame Control. The first three subfields within the frame control and the last field (FCS) are always present in all types of 802.11 frames.  These three subfields consist of two bits Protocol Version subfield, two bits Type subfield, and four bits Subtype subfield.

Frame Control 

The first three fields (Protocol Version, Type and Subtype) in the Frame Control field are always present.  The fields, in their order of appearance in transmission, are:

 Protocol Version
Type
Subtype
To-DS
From-DS
 More-Fragments
Retry
 Power Management
 More Data
 Protected Frame
+HTC/Order

Protocol Version Subfield 
The 2-bits Protocol Version subfield is set to 0 for WLAN (PV0) and 1 for PV1 (IEEE 802.11ah). The revision level is incremented only when there is a fundamental incompatibility between two versions of WLAN standard. PV1 description is incorporated in the latest 802.11-2020 standard.

Types and SubTypes

ToDS and FromDS 
ToDS is one bit in length and set to 1 if destined to Distribution System, while  FromDS is a one-bit length that is set to 1 if originated from Distribution System.

Retry 
Set to 1 if the Data or Management frame is part retransmission of the earlier frame. This bit is reused for different purpose in Control frame.

+HTC/Order 
It is one bit in length and is used for two purposes:

 It is set to 1 in a non-QoS data frame transmitted by a non-QoS WLAN station to indicate the frame being transmitted is using Strictly-Ordered service class (this use is obsolete and will be removed from the future 802.11 Standard).
 It is set to 1 in a QoS data or management frame transmitting at HT or higher rate to indicate that the frame contains HT Control field (see above)

IEEE 802.11bf
IEEE 802.11bf is a mature standard that is capable "to measure the range, velocity, direction, motion, presence, and proximity of people and objects". It is planned to enter into markets within 2024.

References 

Wi-Fi
Networking standards